The 1982 NCAA Division I-A football season was the last for Paul "Bear" Bryant as head coach at Alabama, retiring with  in 

The Penn State Nittany Lions won their first consensus national championship, closing out an  season by defeating Georgia and Heisman Trophy winner Herschel Walker 27–23 in the Sugar Bowl to edge out undefeated SMU for the national championship. It was Joe Paterno's first national championship, after three undefeated non-championship 

UCLA moved from the Los Angeles Memorial Coliseum to the Rose Bowl and fulfilled a promise made by coach Terry Donahue by closing out their season there as well, beating Michigan  in the Rose Bowl on New Year's Day.

It is also the year of "The Play", an improbable finish to the annual rivalry game between Cal and Stanford.

The Aloha Bowl premiered in Honolulu, Hawaii, and was won by Washington.

Rule changes
The penalty for incidental grasping of a facemask was reduced from 15 yards to 5 yards.  The 5 yard version of this penalty would be later abolished in the 2008 season.
Coaches are no longer allowed to request a conference with the referee regarding a misapplication or misinterpretation of a rule, modifying a 1981 rule permitting such conferences, though a player or substitute can still request them.
The penalty for offensive pass interference or illegal touching of a forward pass in the end zone was changed to a 15-yard penalty (5 yards for illegal touching) from a touchback.
Penalties on the defense for fouls committed away from a catchable ball will be enforced from the previous spot and will no longer be considered pass interference.
Intentional grounding where the spot of enforcement is in the end zone will no longer result in an automatic safety.  The defense will have the option to take the result of the play or the safety.
Intentional grounding will not be called if a passer throws the ball out of bounds to conserve time.
Penalties against the offense that occur behind the scrimmage line will be enforced from the previous spot and not from the spot of the foul.
Use of adhesive material (such as stickum) is prohibited.
The penalty for ineligible receiver downfield was reduced from 15 yards plus loss of down to 5 yards plus loss of down.

Conference changes and new programs
This was the first season the Ivy League, Southern Conference, and Southland Conference competed at the I-AA (FCS) level. Southwestern Louisiana was the only team from those three conferences to remain in Division I-A, becoming an independent. 
Ivy League — Brown, Columbia, Cornell, Dartmouth, Harvard, Pennsylvania, Princeton, and Yale
Southern Conference — Appalachian State, Chattanooga, East Tennessee State, Furman, Marshall, The Citadel, VMI, and Western Carolina
Southland Conference — Arkansas State, Lamar, Louisiana Tech, McNeese State, and Texas–Arlington
Southwestern Louisiana, who had been a member of the Southland during the 1981 season, remained in Division I-A as an Independent. The school was renamed the University of Louisiana at Lafayette in 1999.
 Most of the Missouri Valley Conference football schools were also reclassified. This began the few years where the MVC hosted both I-A and I-AA teams. Drake, Illinois State, Indiana State, Southern Illinois, and West Texas State did not meet I-A standards and were reclassified to I-AA. New Mexico State, Tulsa, and Wichita State remained in I-A.
This season also saw the loss of Division I-A independent teams Colgate, Holy Cross, Northeast Louisiana, North Texas State, Richmond, and William & Mary; dropping the total number of Division I-A teams down to 105 from the previous season's 137 teams.
As of 2020, Appalachian State, Arkansas State, Northeast Louisiana (renamed the University of Louisiana at Monroe in 1999), Louisiana Tech, Marshall, and North Texas have returned to Division I-A, renamed FBS in 2006.

Conference standings

Notable rivalry games
 Arizona 28, ASU 18
 Auburn 23, Alabama 22 (Auburn's first victory in the series since 1972; Alabama coach Bear Bryant's last regular season game)
 Cal 25, Stanford 20 (The Play)
 UCLA 20, USC 19 – In the first game of this rivalry contested at the Rose Bowl, USC trailed 20–13 and had fourth down and goal from the one-yard line with 0:01 left in the game. USC scored a touchdown and decided to go for the two-point conversion with 0:00 on the clock. USC announcer Tom Kelly remarked, "Typical of this great rivalry--even when it's over, it isn't over!" On the ensuing try for two by USC, UCLA's Karl Morgan sacked USC QB Scott Tinsley. This occurred within minutes of The Play, which was happening 400 miles to the north in Berkeley.
 USC 17, Notre Dame 13
 Tulane 31, No. 7 LSU 28 (Tulane's first win at Tiger Stadium since 1948 and the Green Wave's most recent victory in the series. The series has not been played annually since 1994 and not at all since 2009.)
 Ohio St. 24, Michigan 14
 No. 8 Nebraska 28, No. 11 Oklahoma 24
 No. 8 Penn St 27, No. 2 Nebraska 24

September
Pittsburgh, with a 33-3 record in the past three seasons and quarterback Dan Marino heading into his senior year, was No. 1 in the preseason AP Poll despite the departure of head coach Jackie Sherrill to Texas A&M. The Panthers were followed by No. 2 Washington, No. 3 Alabama, No. 4 Nebraska, and No. 5 North Carolina. In the first regular-season poll on September 6 (taken before any of the top five teams had begun their schedules), Nebraska and Alabama switched places to No. 3 and No. 4, respectively.

September 11: No. 1 Pittsburgh defeated No. 5 North Carolina 7-6. Nevertheless, No. 2 Washington moved ahead of Pitt in the next poll with a 55-0 shutout of UTEP. No. 3 Nebraska beat Iowa 42-7, No. 4 Alabama won 45-7 at Georgia Tech, and No. 6 Florida (which had already defeated then-No. 15 Miami a week earlier) beat No. 10 USC 17-9. The next poll featured No. 1 Washington, No. 2 Pittsburgh, No. 3 Nebraska, No. 4 Alabama, and No. 5 Florida.

September 18: No. 1 Washington opened their conference schedule with a 23-13 win at Arizona, while No. 2 Pittsburgh beat Florida State 37-17 in Tallahassee. The Panthers were again leapfrogged by a team that dominated a weak opponent, as No. 3 Nebraska beat New Mexico 68-0. No. 4 Alabama defeated Mississippi 42-14, and No. 5 Florida was idle. The next poll featured No. 1 Washington, No. 2 Nebraska, No. 3 Pittsburgh, No. 4 Alabama, and No. 5 Florida.

September 25: No. 1 Washington defeated Oregon 37-21, while No. 2 Nebraska lost at No. 8 Penn State by a score of 27-24. The outcome of the game was controversial as Penn State tight end Mike McCloskey would later admit catching a key pass out of bounds that kept the winning drive alive. No. 3 Pittsburgh beat No. 19 Illinois 20-3. No. 4 Alabama looked vulnerable in a 24-21 win over Vanderbilt while No. 5 Florida defeated Mississippi State 27-17, and the two teams switched places in the next poll: No. 1 Washington, No. 2 Pittsburgh, No. 3 Penn State, No. 4 Florida, and No. 5 Alabama.

October
October 2: No. 1 Washington beat San Diego State 46-25, and No. 2 Pittsburgh came back from a 13-0 fourth-quarter deficit to win 16-13 over No. 14 West Virginia. No. 3 Penn State was idle. No. 4 Florida lost at home to LSU 24-13. No. 5 Alabama defeated Arkansas State 34-7, and No. 6 Georgia won 29-22 at Mississippi State. The next poll featured No. 1 Washington, No. 2 Pittsburgh, No. 3 Penn State, No. 4 Alabama, and No. 5 Georgia.

October 9: No. 1 Washington dominated California 50-7. No. 2 Pittsburgh was idle. No. 4 Alabama defeated No. 3 Penn State in Birmingham 42-21. No. 5 Georgia beat Mississippi 33-10, while No. 6 SMU won 22-19 at Baylor. Alabama moved up in the next poll: No. 1 Washington, No. 2 Alabama, No. 3 Pittsburgh, No. 4 Georgia, and No. 5 SMU.

October 16: No. 1 Washington won 34-17 at Oregon State. No. 2 Alabama was knocked off in Knoxville by Tennessee, 35-28, the Volunteers’ first victory over the Crimson Tide in twelve years. After a 5-0 start and a big win over Penn State, Alabama would lose four of their last six regular-season games to end coach Bear Bryant’s storied career. No. 3 Pittsburgh beat Temple 38-7, No. 4 Georgia defeated Vanderbilt 27-13, No. 5 SMU won 20-14 over Houston, and No. 6 Nebraska beat Kansas State 42-13. The next poll featured No. 1 Washington, No. 2 Pittsburgh, No. 3 Georgia, No. 4 SMU, and No. 5 Nebraska.

October 23: No. 1 Washington struggled to beat Texas Tech 10-3 while No. 2 Pittsburgh shut out Syracuse 14-0, leading the two teams to switch places at the top. No. 3 Georgia won 27-14 at Kentucky, and No. 4 SMU defeated No. 19 Texas 30-17. No. 5 Nebraska squeaked by Missouri 23-19 while No. 6 Arkansas blasted Houston 38-3, leading to another change in the next poll: No. 1 Pittsburgh, No. 2 Washington, No. 3 Georgia, No. 4 SMU, and No. 5 Arkansas.

October 30: No. 1 Pittsburgh beat Louisville 63-14, while John Elway and Stanford stunned No. 2 Washington in a 43-31 shootout. No. 3 Georgia defeated Memphis 34-3 but was still passed by No. 4 SMU, which drubbed Texas A&M 47-9. No. 5 Arkansas hosted Rice and won 24-6. No. 7 Arizona State beat No. 12 USC 17-10 to remain undefeated and move up in the next poll: No. 1 Pittsburgh, No. 2 SMU, No. 3 Georgia, No. 4 Arizona State, and No. 5 Arkansas.

November
November 6: No. 1 Pittsburgh was stunned at home by Notre Dame, 31-16. The teams behind them switched spots again, as No. 2 SMU won 41-14 at Rice but No. 3 Georgia was even more impressive with a 44-0 shutout of No. 20 Florida. No. 4 Arizona State beat Oregon State 30-16, but No. 5 Arkansas fell 24-17 to Baylor. Moving back into the top five were No. 6 Nebraska, which defeated Oklahoma State 48-10, and No. 7 Penn State, which blanked North Carolina State 54-0. The poll featured No. 1 Georgia, No. 2 SMU, No. 3 Arizona State, No. 4 Nebraska, and No. 5 Penn State.

November 13: No. 1 Georgia won at Auburn, 19-14, to clinch the SEC title and a Sugar Bowl berth, while No. 2 SMU traveled to Lubbock and beat Texas Tech 34-27. In a Pac-10 showdown in Tempe, No. 7 Washington beat No. 3 Arizona State 17-13. No. 4 Nebraska defeated Iowa State 48-10 but was passed in the next poll by No. 5 Penn State, who had beaten them in September and won 24-14 this week at No. 13 Notre Dame. The poll featured No. 1 Georgia, No. 2 SMU, No. 3 Penn State, No. 4 Nebraska, and No. 5 Washington.

November 20: No. 1 Georgia, No. 3 Penn State, and No. 4 Nebraska were idle. Meanwhile, No. 2 SMU and No. 9 Arkansas—the first- and second-place teams in the SWC—matched up against each other. In a controversial late-game decision, SMU coach Bobby Collins chose to tie the game with an extra point rather than try for a two-point conversion which would have given the Mustangs the lead. Neither team was able to score in the remaining time, resulting in a 17-17 tie. By avoiding a loss, SMU clinched the SWC title and a Cotton Bowl berth, but damaged their national championship prospects by giving up their chance at a perfect record. (Ironically, the sacrifice turned out to be unnecessary, as Arkansas went on to lose their final game and would have finished behind SMU in the conference standings even with a head-to-head win.) No. 5 Washington lost 24-20 to Washington State on an exciting day in the Pac-10 which also featured a last-second 20-19 victory by No. 11 UCLA over No. 15 USC as well as "The Play" between California and Stanford. No. 6 Pittsburgh defeated Rutgers 52-6 and moved up in the next poll: No. 1 Georgia, No. 2 Penn State, No. 3 Nebraska, No. 4 SMU, and No. 5 Pittsburgh.

November 26-27: No. 1 Georgia finished their season by defeating Georgia Tech 38-18. In a game between teams trying to stay alive for the national title, No. 2 Penn State shut down No. 5 Pittsburgh 19-10. No. 3 Nebraska faced No. 11 Oklahoma for the Big 8 championship and an Orange Bowl berth, and the Cornhuskers won 28-24. No. 4 SMU had finished its schedule. No. 6 Arizona State needed a win over rival Arizona to clinch the Pac-10 title and a Rose Bowl berth, but the Sun Devils lost 28-18, and No. 8 UCLA (which had finished its schedule with the USC win) was elevated to first place. Their opponent would be No. 20 Michigan, which won the Big Ten championship despite a loss in their rivalry game against Ohio State.

The final AP Poll of the regular season featured No. 1 Georgia, No. 2 Penn State, No. 3 Nebraska, No. 4 SMU, and No. 5 UCLA. The Sugar Bowl would match up Georgia and Penn State in a de facto national title game, the Cotton Bowl featured SMU and No. 6 Pittsburgh, the Orange Bowl selected SEC runner-up No. 13 LSU to face Nebraska, and the Rose Bowl had the traditional Big Ten/Pac-10 showdown between UCLA and Michigan.

No. 1 and No. 2 progress

Bowl games

Sugar Bowl: No. 2 Penn State 27, No. 1 Georgia 23
Orange Bowl: No. 3 Nebraska 21, No. 13 LSU  20
Cotton Bowl: No. 4 SMU 7, No. 6 Pittsburgh 3
Rose Bowl: No. 5 UCLA 24, No. 19 Michigan 14

Other Bowls:
Sun: North Carolina 26, No. 8 Texas 10
Gator: Florida State 31, No. 10 West Virginia 12
Tangerine: No. 18 Auburn 33, Boston College 26
Liberty: Alabama 21, Illinois 15
Bluebonnet: No. 14 Arkansas 28, Florida 24
Peach: Iowa 28, Tennessee 22
Fiesta: No. 11 Arizona State 32, No. 12 Oklahoma 21
Independence: Wisconsin 14, Kansas State 3
Hall of Fame: Air Force 36, Vanderbilt 28
Holiday: No. 17 Ohio State 47, Brigham Young 17
Aloha: No. 9 Washington 21, No. 16 Maryland 20
California: Fresno State 29, Bowling Green 28

Final AP and UPI rankings

Heisman Trophy voting
The Heisman Trophy is given to the year's most outstanding player

Source:

Other major awards
Outland Trophy (Interior Lineman): Dave Rimington, Nebraska
Vince Lombardi/Rotary Award (Lineman or Linebacker): Dave Rimington, Nebraska
Walter Camp Award (back): Herschel Walker, Georgia
Davey O'Brien Award (Quarterback): Todd Blackledge, Penn State
Maxwell Award (college player of the year): Herschel Walker, Georgia

References